Pazienza is an Italian surname.

Notable people

Artists
Andrea Pazienza an Italian Comic Book Artist.

Sports
Michele Pazienza an Italian Footballer
Vinny Pazienza a former Italian American boxer

Music
Vinnie Paz an Italian American Rapper.

Other
Francesco Pazienza a former Italian Militant and current Businessman.
Chez Pazienza an American Journalist.